Pareuxoa is a genus of moths of the family Noctuidae.

Selected species
Pareuxoa flavicosta (Wallengren, 1860)
Pareuxoa fuscata Angulo & Olivares, 1999
Pareuxoa gravida (Mabille, 1885)
Pareuxoa janae Angulo, 1990
Pareuxoa koehleri Olivares, 1992
Pareuxoa lineifera (Blanchard, 1852)
Pareuxoa luteicosta Angulo & Olivares, 1999
Pareuxoa meditata Köhler, 1967
Pareuxoa nigrolineata (Jana-Sáenz, 1989)
Pareuxoa parajanae Olivares, 1992
Pareuxoa perdita (Staudinger, 1889)
Pareuxoa sanctisebastiani Köhler, 1954

References

Noctuinae